The OFC Nations Cup is an international association football tournament held among the OFC member nations. It was held every two years from 1996 to 2004; before 1996 there were two other tournaments held at irregular intervals, under the name Oceania Nations Cup. No competition was held in 2006, but in the 2008 edition, which also acted as a qualification tournament for the 2009 FIFA Confederations Cup and for a play-off for the 2010 FIFA World Cup, the New Zealand national football team emerged as winners.

Historically, a very large gulf separated Australia and New Zealand from the smaller island competitors, and little attention was paid to the tournament by the rest of the football world. In fact, after the first eight editions, the trophy had been won only by Australia and New Zealand. In the 2012 OFC Nations Cup, Tahiti became the first team outside of Australia and New Zealand to win the cup. A chief reason for the success of Australia was it having left the OFC.

History

First editions (1973–1980)

This tournament began in 1973 as the "Oceania Cup". This first edition was staged without a qualifying round and was won by the host in Auckland, New Zealand that defeated Tahiti, 2–0. The tournament was characterised by the absence of the Australian team and the presence of some teams not members of FIFA, such as New Hebrides, which later became Vanuatu after gaining independence in 1980.

The second edition of the Oceania Cup took place in 1980 in New Caledonia, at that time not a FIFA member. Australia 
played the final match in Nouméa and defeated Tahiti, 4–2. The tournament was characterised by a poor result for New Zealand: out in the Group Stage losing against Tahiti (3–1) and Fiji (4–0). Two years later they qualified for the 1982 FIFA World Cup. These two editions were the only without qualifying rounds. After this edition the tournament was discontinued. So Australia maintained the Oceania Champion title for 16 years without playing in any tournaments. Between the years of absence (1981–1995) the most important Oceanian region tournament was the Trans-Tasman Cup played only between Australia and New Zealand.

Return, every two years (1996–2004)
In 1996, when OFC reached the official status of Confederation for FIFA, the tournament reappeared as the "Oceania Nations Cup" and served as a qualifier for the Confederations Cup. The 1996 edition lacked a host nation but had its inaugural qualifying round, contested with four teams playing semifinals and final match on two legs both: Australia and New Zealand, who played the semifinal also for the Trans-Tasman Cup, and the second semifinal match between Tahiti as Polynesia Cup holders and Solomon Islands as Melanesia Cup holders. Australia defended its title of The Cup winning easily in the final match, on two legs, against Tahiti (6–0 and 5–0). The topscorer of this tournament, Kris Trajanovski, scored all his seven goals in the final match: four on the first leg in Papeete (Tahiti) and three on the second leg in Canberra (Australia). Thanks to this result, this Australian team, managed by the English Terry Venables and not by the Scottish Oceania Champion Eddie Thomson, took part to the 1997 FIFA Confederations Cup in Saudi Arabia.

In the 1998 edition six teams participated, hosted by Australia and dominated by Australia and New Zealand. In the final match, played in Brisbane, New Zealand beat the host Australia 1–0 with a goal by Mark Burton. In this edition the Australian player Damian Mori scored 10 goals, the standing record. He is also the overall Oceania Nations Cup top scorer with 14 goals, scored in three editions: one in 1996, ten in 1998 and three in 2002.

The fifth edition was hosted by Tahiti in 2000. The tournament structure was confirmed and again the tournament was dominated by Australia and New Zealand who reached the final match in Papeete. Australia won their third title by a score of 2–0, qualifying for the 2001 FIFA Confederations Cup. Fiji, who qualified for this edition, was forced to withdraw due to civil war and was replaced by Vanuatu, who impressed in the semifinal against Australia: the Socceroos, managed by Frank Farina, won 1–0 thanks only to a penalty kick by Kevin Muscat. Two years later the Australian team finished third in the 2001 FIFA Confederations Cup in South Korea and Japan.

For the 2002 edition, hosted by New Zealand, eight teams participated, divided into two groups won by Australia and New Zealand. This was their third consecutive final match. The Australian side won the semifinal against a brave Tahiti only after extra time. Soccer Australia was involved in financial problems: the non-existent financial contribution meant that the Australian players had to pay their own way to get to New Zealand, so Scott Chipperfield became the only one of Australia's large European contingent to answer the call and perform for his country in their time of need, resulting in a weak team for the tournament. So the final was won for the third time by the All Whites beating their historical rivals 1–0 in Auckland with a late Ryan Nelsen goal.

In the 2004 edition, which served also as the 2006 FIFA World Cup qualification and was played in Australia, six nations took part playing each other in a unique group, with the first two playing a final match in two legs. During the group stage Vanuatu surprisingly beat New Zealand 4–2, but lost all their remaining matches. This and a draw with Australia (2–2) allowed Solomon Islands to claim second place and a berth in the final match against Australia. In the final, the Solomon Islands were beaten 5–1 on their home ground Honiara and 6–0 in Sydney. Moreover, this was the first, and until today the only time that a coach, Frank Farina, has won the Oceania Nations Cup trophy twice. Two years later, managed by Dutchman Guus Hiddink and composed of many 2004 Oceania Nations Cup scorers such as Tim Cahill, Harry Kewell, Mark Bresciano, Brett Emerton, John Aloisi, Australia reached the Second Round of the 2006 FIFA World Cup in Germany. However, this was the fourth and last OFC title for Australia: in 2006 they decided to join AFC, changing considerably the Oceania football scene.

A new era (2006–present)
Australia joined the Asian Football Confederation on 1 January 2006, ceasing to be a member of OFC, leaving New Zealand as the only major power in the OFC. The 2007 South Pacific Games, won by New Caledonia, served as a qualifying round for the three lowest ranked teams in the OFC, with the winners qualifying for the 2008 OFC Nations Cup. The 2008 OFC Nations Cup was played without a fixed venue and with four teams playing each other at home and away in one group. The tournament also served as part of the OFC's qualifying competition for the 2010 FIFA World Cup. New Zealand emerged easily as winners for the fourth time ahead of New Caledonia, winning five matches of six. Surprisingly, Fiji won the last match against New Zealand in Lautoka (Fiji) for 2–0 with two goals of Roy Krishna. The top-scorer Shane Smeltz (New Zealand) scored eight goals: four against the runners up New Caledonia beaten 3–1 away and 3–0 at home.

The 2012 edition of the tournament was originally meant to be played in Fiji, but they were stripped from hosting due to the ongoing legal dispute involving OFC general secretary Tai Nicholas and Fijian authorities. Hosting rights was moved to the Solomon Islands as they were joined by New Zealand, New Caledonia, Vanuatu, Tahiti, Fiji, Papua New Guinea and Samoa (winner of the qualifying tournament). The draw which was similar to the 2012 edition with them competing in two groups of four teams, with the top two in each group qualifying for the semi-finals. After 9 days, Tahiti and New Caledonia reached the final in Lawson Tama Stadium with Tahiti winning 1–0 with a goal from Steevy Chong Hue. With this, Tahiti became the first team other than Australia (no longer part of OFC) and New Zealand to be crowned Oceania champions. The tournament also served as part of the OFC's qualifying competition for the 2014 FIFA World Cup.

Format

The first two editions were played without any qualifying rounds. For the successive three tournaments, Australia and New Zealand were seeded into the tournament automatically, while the remaining ten nations played to qualify. The Polynesian and Melanesian Cups, each played between five nations grouped on a geographical basis, served as qualifications via a round-robin tournament, with the highest ranked two teams in each competition qualifying for the actual OFC Nations Cup.

With the postponement and then cancellation of the Melanesian Cup, and a similar fate befalling its Polynesian equivalent, the format of the tournament changed in 2002. FIFA rankings determined the seedings of all twelve teams, and the lower six teams played a group stage for two qualifier positions into the main tournament. The 2002 Cup tournament proper was played with two groups of four teams (again in round-robin style), which led into a 4-way knockout stage, playing for the top four positions.

In 2004, the format changed once again, returning to a format similar to that of the 1996–2000 tournaments, with five teams each playing in two qualifying groups and Australia and New Zealand seeded to the actual tournament, played as a group stage of six, with a home and away Final played between the two highest-placed teams. This tournament doubled also as qualifying round for the 2006 FIFA World Cup.

For the 2008 tournament, the format altered again. The 2007 South Pacific Games football tournament served as a qualification tournament, with the gold, silver and bronze winning nations progressing to the main, round-robin format, tournament, for which New Zealand qualified automatically. New Zealand emerged as winners of the 2008 OFC Nations Cup, ahead of New Caledonia, and thus qualified for the 2009 FIFA Confederations Cup and a playoff with the fifth placed team from the AFC for a place in the 2010 FIFA World Cup.

Results

Summaries

  2004 tournament was held as a round-robin tournament in Australia followed by the final by two teams of home and away.

Summary

* hosts
1 Australia left the OFC in 2006 and became a full member of the AFC.

Records and statistics

Awards 

There are currently four post-tournament awards
 the Best Player for most valuable player;
 the Top Goalscorer for most prolific goal scorer;
 the Best Goalkeeper  for most outstanding goalkeeper; 
 the Fair Play Award for the team with the best record of fair play.

References

External links
 Oceania Nations Cup on RSSSF archive
 OFC official website

 
Oceania Football Confederation competitions
Oceanian championships
Recurring sporting events established in 1973